Camouflage trees (also known as fake trees, false trees, and observation trees) were observation posts invented in 1915 by French painter Lucien-Victor Guirand de Scevola while leading the French army's Section de Camouflage.

They were used by France, UK, and Germany in trench warfare during World War I.

Nomenclature 

English speakers also called camouflage trees "fake trees", "observation trees," and "false trees".

Germans called them Baumbeobachter (English: tree observers).

Context 
During World War I, both sides on the Western Front were engaged in trench warfare, making observations of enemy forces' activity difficult.

Use 

The camouflage tree was invented by the French painter Lucien-Victor Guirand de Scévola, leader of the French Army's Section de Camouflage, at the request of General de Castelnau. It was first used in May 1915 during the Second Battle of Artois. 

The French Army subsequently shared the design with the British Army, who assigned Solomon Joseph Solomon to lead a program to make a British camouflage tree. Solomon Joseph Solomon directed artist and sculptor Leon Underwood of the Royal Engineers Camouflage Section to build the tree. Underwood selected a dead willow tree in no man's land between trenches, and sketched it. His sketches were used to build a replica that incorporated a steel-armored observation tower and a periscope to protect the user. One night in March 1916, the original tree was cut down and replaced with the camouflaged tree.
Germany used a camouflage tree in 1917 in Oosttaverne (or Oostaverne) Wood near near Messines, Belgium during the Battle of Messines. The German design covered the viewing hole with wire mesh.

Legacy 
A British camouflage tree remains in the permanent collection of the Imperial War Museum's First World War Galleries.

The Australian War Memorial displayed a German camouflage tree during the centenary of World War I.

See also 

 Technology during World War I
 Military camouflage

References 

Military equipment of World War I
Science and technology during World War I
20th-century inventions
French inventions
Technical intelligence
Camouflage